Gowk (also Romanized as Govak) is a village in Howmeh Rural District, in the Central District of Bam County, Kerman Province, Iran. At the 2006 census, its population was 14, in 4 families.

References 

Populated places in Bam County